Route 166 is a minor state highway in southern Connecticut running from Westbrook to Old Saybrook. The route primarily serves as a connector from I-95 to the Saybrook Manor section of Old Saybrook.

Route description
Route 166 begins at an intersection with Route 153 in the eastern part of the town of Westbrook. It heads east, roughly paralleling I-95 on the north, into the town of Old Saybrook. Along the way, it passes by the Westbrook Block company just before crossing the town line. In Old Saybrook, it turns south, crossing I-95 along the Rosario Aloisio Memorial Bridge, with an interchange at exit 66. It continues southeast over the Amtrak Northeast Corridor line to end at an intersection with US 1 in the western part of Old Saybrook. The entire route is known as Spencer Plain Road and is classified as a minor arterial road carrying average daily volumes of 5,600 vehicles per day.

History
Route 166 was established from town roads in 1935, and has had no major changes in alignment or designation since.

Junction list

References

External links

166
Transportation in Middlesex County, Connecticut